The Centre for the Philosophy of Nature and Science Studies (abbr. CNV) involves a small group of scientists, philosophers of science, and researchers at the University of Copenhagen. It engages in the  interdisciplinary field denominated as the philosophy of nature and science studies, including history, philosophy and sociology of science. It operates under the Department of Science Education at the Faculty of Science.

External links

University of Copenhagen